Hans Georg Hermann von Plessen (26 November 1841 – 28 January 1929) was a Prussian Colonel General with the rank of Generalfeldmarschall and Canon of Brandenburg. He held the office of His Majesty's Orderly Adjutant General to Kaiser Wilhelm II, thus making him one of the Emperor's closest confidants. During World War I he simultaneously served as Commandant of the Imperial Grand Headquarters.

By 1918 he was the oldest serving officer in the Imperial German Army, although Paul von Hindenburg falsely claimed this for himself. Von Plessen also was a recipient of the Pour le Mérite, Germany's highest military honor. He remained devoted to the Kaiser until the collapse of the monarchy in November, 1918.

Life 
Hans von Plessen was born in 1841 as the son of General Hermann von Plessen. He joined the military in 1861 as an officer cadet. He was on duty during the Second Schleswig War but didn't participate in the war, serving in the Rhineland as a Second-Lieutenant. During the Austro-Prussian War he fought in the Battle of Königgrätz. As a brigade adjutant, Plessen served in the Franco-Prussian War and participated in the Loire Campaign and the Battle of Le Mans. After the war he became a general staff officer. In 1872 he was promoted to Hauptmann. Plessen married Elisabeth von Langenbeck in January 1874, a marriage resulting in two sons. Elisabeth was the daughter of Bernhard von Langenbeck. In 1877, Plessen then became a staff officer in the 1st Guards Infantry Division under Alexander August Wilhelm von Pape. In 1879 Plessen was promoted to Major and in December became an aide-de-camp of Kaiser Wilhelm I. In 1885 Plessen became an Oberstleutnant. In 1888, Plessen became the commander of the 1st Foot Guards, being promoted to Oberst on 4 August 1888.

He was made a Generalmajor on 9 February 1891 and received command of the 55th Infantry Brigade. In 1892 he became an adjutant general to Kaiser Wilhelm II. He was promoted to Generalleutnant in 1894 and to General der Infantrie in 1899. In 1907, Plessen replaced Berhard von Werder as largely ceremonial head of the Mounted Feldjäger Corps, a company-strength unit of officers serving as couriers. In 1908, he received the rank of Generaloberst. During World War I Plessen continued to serve as adjutant general and was Commandant of the Imperial Grand Headquarters in the field. He was awarded the prestigious Pour le Mérite on 24 March 1918. On 17 November 1918, after accompanying the emperor into exile, he was retired with the rank of Generaloberst mit dem Range als Generalfeldmarschall.

Awards
German honours
 Knight of the Order of the Red Eagle, 4th Class with Swords, 1866; 2nd Class with Oak Leaves, Swords on Ring and Crown, 1893; with Star, 12 September 1896; Grand Cross
 Knight of the Order of the Black Eagle, with Collar and in Diamonds
 Knight of the Order of the Prussian Crown, 1st Class
 Grand Commander's Cross of the Royal House Order of Hohenzollern, with Swords
 Iron Cross, 2nd Class 1870; 1st Class, 1914
 Pour le Mérite (military), 24 March 1918
 Grand Cross of the Order of the Zähringer Lion, with Oak Leaves, 1899
 Grand Cross of the Order of Berthold the First, 1901
 Knight of the House Order of Fidelity, 1905
 Grand Cross of the Order of Merit of the Bavarian Crown, 1902
 Knight of the Order of Saint Hubert, 1906
 Grand Cross of the Military Merit Order, with Swords
 Grand Cross of the Order of Henry the Lion, 1896
 Grand Cross of the Saxe-Ernestine House Order
 Grand Cross of the Order of Philip the Magnanimous, 15 October 1894
 Grand Cross of the Ludwig Order, 22 August 1904
 Grand Cross of the House Order of the Wendish Crown, with Golden Crown
 Knight of the Order of the Rue Crown
 Knight of the Military Order of Saint Henry
 Grand Cross of the Albert Order, with Golden Star and Silver Crown
 Grand Cross of the Friedrich Order, 1896
 Grand Cross of the Order of the Württemberg Crown, 1899

Foreign honours
 Grand Cross of the Order of Franz Joseph, 1893
 Knight of the Order of the Iron Crown, 1st Class, 1895
 Grand Cross of the Imperial Order of Leopold, 1897; in Diamonds, 1900
 Grand Cross of the Order of Saint Stephen, 1903; in Diamonds, 1908
 Grand Cordon of the Order of Leopold
 Grand Cross of the Order of Saint Alexander
 Grand Cross of the Order of the Dannebrog, in Diamonds, 3 July 1907
 Grand Cross of the Order of the Redeemer
 Grand Cross of the Order of Prince Danilo I
 Grand Cross of the Order of Saint Olav, 15 December 1906
 Order of the Lion and the Sun, 1st Class in Diamonds
 Grand Cross of the Military Order of Saint Benedict of Aviz
 Knight of the Order of Saint Andrew
 Knight of the Order of Saint Alexander Nevsky, in Diamonds
 Grand Cross of the Order of Charles III, 2 November 1905
 Knight of the Order of the Seraphim, 6 August 1908
 Honorary Grand Cross of the Royal Victorian Order, 23 November 1899

Dates of rank 
 Fähnrich—1 September 1861
 Leutnant—11 November 1862
 Oberleutnant—22 March 1868
 Hauptmann—16 April 1872
 Major—18 May 1879
 Oberstleutnant—14 July 1885
 Oberst—4 August 1888
 Generalmajor—9 February 1891
 Generalleutnant—14 May 1894
 Generaloberst—19 September 1908
 Generaloberst mit dem Rang als Generalfeldmarschall—17 November 1918

References

External links

1841 births
1929 deaths
Colonel generals of Prussia
People from Spandau
Recipients of the Iron Cross (1870), 2nd class
Recipients of the Iron Cross (1914), 1st class
Recipients of the Pour le Mérite (military class)
Grand Crosses of the Order of Franz Joseph
Grand Crosses of the Order of the Dannebrog
Annulled Honorary Knights Grand Cross of the Royal Victorian Order
Prussian military personnel of the Second Schleswig War
Prussian people of the Austro-Prussian War
German military personnel of the Franco-Prussian War
19th-century Prussian military personnel
Grand Crosses of the Order of Saint Stephen of Hungary
Grand Crosses of the Order of Aviz
Grand Crosses of the Military Merit Order (Bavaria)
Military personnel from Berlin